Khadija Mohamed is a Somali diplomat. She was the Ambassador of Somalia to Iraq, based at the Somali embassy in Baghdad. She was assigned to the office on 2 April 2015. In 2016 she was appointed as the Ambassador of Somalia to Pakistan.

References

Living people
1982 births
Ambassadors of Somalia to Pakistan
Women ambassadors
Somalian women diplomats